Alexandru Cătălin Chiriță (born 24 June 1996) is a Romanian footballer who plays as an attacking midfielder. He played in Liga I for Petrolul Ploiești, CFR Cluj and Sepsi OSK Sfântu Gheorghe.

Personal life
His father, Daniel Chiriță, was also a football player. They played together at AFC Filipeștii de Pădure and CS Ștefănești.

References

External links
 
 
 
 

1996 births
Living people
Sportspeople from Ploiești
Romanian footballers
Association football wingers
Liga I players
FC Petrolul Ploiești players
CFR Cluj players
Sepsi OSK Sfântu Gheorghe players
Romanian expatriate sportspeople in France